Best of is a 1996 retrospective compilation album by Swing Out Sister, containing their successful singles spanning the years 1986 through 1996. It is their first compilation album—and last Fontana Records album.

Track listing 

CD & cassette version

 "Breakout" - (3:46)  (Andy Connell/Corinne Drewery/Martin Jackson) 
 "Am I the Same Girl" - (4:07)  (E.Record/S.Sanders) 
 "You on My Mind" - (3:32)  (A. Connell/C. Drewery/Paul Staveley O'Duffy) 
 "Twilight World" (Edit) - (4:05)  (A. Connell/C. Drewery/M. Jackson) 
 "Where in The World?" - (5:33)  (A. Connell/C. Drewery) 
 "La-La (Means I Love You)" (UK Guitar Edit) - (3:59)  (T. Bell/W. Hart) 
 "Ordinary People" - (6:22)  (A. Connell/C. Drewery) 
 "Get in Touch with Yourself" - (5:08)  (A. Connell/C. Drewery/P. S. O'Duffy) 
 "Surrender" - (3:53)  (A. Connell/C. Drewery/M. Jackson) 
 "Heaven Only Knows" - (4:09)  (Denzil Foster/Thomas McElroy) 
 "Better Make It Better" (Edit) - (3:51)  (A. Connell/C. Drewery) 
 "Notgonnachange" (O' Duffy 7" Mix) - (4:20)  (A. Connell/C. Drewery) 
 "Fooled by a Smile" - (4:06)  (A. Connell/C. Drewery/M. Jackson) 
 "Waiting Game" - (4:15)  (A. Connell/C. Drewery) 
 "Forever Blue" - (4:17)  (A. Connell/C. Drewery) 
 "Windmills of Your Mind"  (M. Legrand/A. Bergman/M. Bergman) 

CD Japan version

 "Now You're Not Here" (Original Single Mix) - (4:43)  (A. Connell/C. Drewery/P. S. O'Duffy) 
 "Breakout" - (3:46)  (Andy Connell/Corinne Drewery/Martin Jackson) 
 "Am I the Same Girl" - (4:07)  (E.Record/S.Sanders) 
 "You on My Mind" - (3:32)  (A. Connell/C. Drewery/Paul Staveley O'Duffy) 
 "Twilight World" (Edit) - (4:05)  (A. Connell/C. Drewery/M. Jackson) 
 "Where in The World?" - (5:33)  (A. Connell/C. Drewery) 
 "La-La (Means I Love You)" (UK Guitar Edit) - (3:59)  (T. Bell/W. Hart) 
 "Ordinary People" - (6:22)  (A. Connell/C. Drewery) 
 "Get in Touch with Yourself" - (5:08)  (A. Connell/C. Drewery/P. S. O'Duffy) 
 "Surrender" - (3:53)  (A. Connell/C. Drewery/M. Jackson) 
 "Heaven Only Knows" - (4:09)  (Denzil Foster/Thomas McElroy) 
 "Better Make It Better" (Edit) - (3:51)  (A. Connell/C. Drewery) 
 "Notgonnachange" (O' Duffy 7" Mix) - (4:20)  (A. Connell/C. Drewery) 
 "Fooled by a Smile" - (4:06)  (A. Connell/C. Drewery/M. Jackson) 
 "Waiting Game" - (4:15)  (A. Connell/C. Drewery) 
 "Forever Blue" - (4:17)  (A. Connell/C. Drewery)

Personnel 
Swing Out Sister

 Andy Connell – keyboards
 Corinne Drewery – lead vocals

Certifications and sales

Notes

Swing Out Sister albums
1996 greatest hits albums
Fontana Records compilation albums